Autohead is a 2016 film directed by Rohit Mittal.

Cast

References

2016 films
2010s Hindi-language films